The women's rhythmic team all-around gymnastic competition at the 2022 Commonwealth Games in Birmingham, England took place on August 4th at the Arena Birmingham. A total of 21 competitors from seven nations took part.

Canada won the gold medal with a score of 272.950, just over four points ahead of second place Australia (268.650). The host team, England, took the bronze medal with a score of 268.650, its first medal in the event since 2010.

Schedule
The schedule was as follows:

Results
The finals results:

References

External links
Results
 

Women's rhythmic team all-around